This is the discography of American singer Pat Benatar. It consists of 11 studio albums, nine live albums, 27 compilation albums, 39 singles, and 34 music videos.

Albums

Studio albums

Live albums

Compilations 
{| class="wikitable"
|- valign="bottom"
!Year
!Album
!width="40"|US
!width="40"|UK
!width="40"|AUS
!width="40"|NZ
!Additional information
|-
|1974
|Coxon's Army: Live from Sam Miller's Exchange Cafe
|align="center"|—
|align="center"|—
|align="center"|—
|align="center"|—
|Pat Benatar sings the following songs: 
"Can't Help Lovin' Dat Man" - written by Oscar Hammerstein II and Jerome Kern, "Respect" - written by Otis Redding, "If He Walked Into My Life" - written by Jerry Herman, "Medley: Brother Love's Traveling Salvation Show/Yes We Can Can" - written by Neil Diamond / Allen Toussaint.
|-
|1984
|Pat Benatar Hit Videos
|align="center"|—
|align="center"|—
|align="center"|—
|align="center"|—
|One-VHS tape featuring four music videos; also includes footage from the behind-the-scenes documentary, The Making of Love Is a Battlefield, later included on the DVD Choice Cuts: Pat Benatar - The Complete Video Collection. The complete video collection is an Easter egg.
|-
|1985
|Pat Benatar in Concert
|align="center"|—
|align="center"|—
|align="center"|—
|align="center"|—
|One-VHS tape featuring live tracks from 1982, for an HBO special broadcast in 1983.  Released on DVD in 1999 under the title Live from New Haven. The DVD is missing the final track "Little Paradise".
|-
|1987
|Pat Benatar: The Visual Music Collection
|align="center"|—
|align="center"|—
|align="center"|—
|align="center"|—
|Collection featuring 12 music videos through 1987, including the unreleased "Painted Desert".  Released on VHS and LaserDisc.
|-
|1989
|Best Shots
|align="center"|67
|align="center"|6
|align="center"|19
|align="center"|5
|Greatest hits compilation issued internationally (one-CD), 1987. Completely different release (one-CD) by same title issued in the US, 1989. US release re-issued in 2003 (one-CD/one-DVD) with the DVD Choice Cuts: Pat Benatar - The Complete Video Collection.  
|-
|1994
|All Fired Up: The Very Best of Pat Benatar
|align="center"|—
|align="center"|—
|align="center"|—
|align="center"|2
|Two-CD compilation featuring remastered greatest hits, mostly edit versions. Last album released by Chrysalis Records.  Issued in the UK with a different cover. 
|-
|rowspan="2"|1996
|Pat Benatar: Heartbreaker - Sixteen Classic Performances
|align="center"|—
|align="center"|—
|align="center"|—
|align="center"|—
|One-CD featuring hits, album and two unreleased live tracks.
|-
|Back to Back Hits: Blondie/Pat Benatar
|align="center"|—
|align="center"|—
|align="center"|—
|align="center"|—
|One-CD featuring five hits from both artists. Re-issued four more times with four different covers each time.
|-
|1998
|Pat Benatar: Eight-Fifteen-Eighty
|align="center"|—
|align="center"|—
|align="center"|—
|align="center"|—
|One-CD featuring live tracks from 1980.
|-
|rowspan="2"|1999
|Pat Benatar All-Time Greatest Hits
|align="center"|—
|align="center"|—
|align="center"|—
|align="center"|—
|Three-CD box set featuring hits, album and live tracks.
|-
|Synchronistic Wanderings: Recorded Anthology 1979-1999
|align="center"|—
|align="center"|—
|align="center"|—
|align="center"|—
|Three-CD box set featuring hits, album tracks, soundtrack and previously unreleased rarities.
|-
|2000
|Extended Versions: Pat Benatar - The Encore Collection
|align="center"|—
|align="center"|—
|align="center"|—
|align="center"|—
|One-CD featuring hits and album tracks from the King Biscuit Flower Hour.
|-
|rowspan="3"|2001
|Best of Pat Benatar Volume 1 and Volume 2
|align="center"|—
|align="center"|—
|align="center"|—
|align="center"|—
|Two CDs featuring hits and album tracks. Released both separately and together. 
|-
|Pat Benatar/Neil Giraldo: Summer Vacation Tour Book DVD
|align="center"|—
|align="center"|—
|align="center"|—
|align="center"|—
|One-DVD featuring 15 live tracks including four new songs-originally released to fan club members with different packaging but same track listing.
|-
|Pat Benatar/Neil Giraldo: Summer Vacation Soundtrack
|align="center"|—
|align="center"|—
|align="center"|—
|align="center"|—
|One-CD 15-track live concert album featuring four new songs-originally released to fan club members with different packaging and additional tracks on two CDs.
|-
|2002
|Classic Masters: Pat Benatar
|align="center"|—
|align="center"|—
|align="center"|—
|align="center"|—
|One-CD featuring remastered hits and album tracks. 
|-
|rowspan="2"|2003
|Choice Cuts: Pat Benatar - The Complete Video Collection
|align="center"|—
|align="center"|—
|align="center"|—
|align="center"|—
|One-DVD featuring 25 music videos plus four bonus tracks and an Easter egg.  DVD sales of 10,000 +.
|-
|From the Front Row...Live: Pat Benatar
|align="center"|—
|align="center"|—
|align="center"|—
|align="center"|—
|One DVD-audio disc playable on most DVD players featuring a collection of remastered live tracks.
|-
|rowspan="2"|2004
|Best of Pat Benatar Volume 1 and Volume 2
|align="center"|—
|align="center"|—
|align="center"|—
|align="center"|—
|Two CDs featuring hits and album tracks; previously released as two separate CDs. Re-issued in the 2008 "Green Series". 
|-
|Pat Benatar Greatest Hits Live
|align="center"|—
|align="center"|—
|align="center"|—
|align="center"|—
|One-CD recorded live in Austin, Texas 1981, from the King Biscuit Flower Hour.  
|-
|2005
|Greatest Hits
|align="center"|47
|align="center"|—
|align="center"|—
|align="center"|26
|One-CD 20-track comprehensive hit singles collection.  Re-issued in 2007 (two CDs/one DVD) with the CD Live from Earth and the DVD Choice Cuts: Pat Benatar: The Complete Video Collection. Re-issued in the 2008 "Green Series". Re-issued 2010 in the Live Life Greener Merch Box (includes green bag).
|-
|2008
|Ultimate Collection
|align="center"|—
|align="center"|—
|align="center"|—
|align="center"|—
|Two-CD compilation with 40 tracks, featuring an acoustic version of "Everytime I Fall Back" from an appearance on the soap opera The Young and the Restless; digital collection
|-
|rowspan="2"|2009
|Pat Benatar Collector's Edition
|align="center"|—
|align="center"|—
|align="center"|—
|align="center"|—
|Three-CD compilation in a tin packaging released by Madacy Records
|-
|10 Great Songs
|align="center"|123
|align="center"|—
|align="center"|—
|align="center"|—
|One-CD compilation 
|-
|2013
|Icons
|align="center"|—
|align="center"|—
|align="center"|—
|align="center"|—
|One-CD compilation 
|-
|2014
|The Best of Pat Benatar: 20th Century Masters/The Millennium Collection
|align="center"|—
|align="center"|—
|align="center"|—
|align="center"|—
|One-CD compilation 
|-
|2014
|The One and Only CD: Pat Benatar the very best of'
|align="center"|—
|align="center"|—
|align="center"|—
|align="center"|—
|One-CD compilation different track listing than the European very best of
|-
|2015
| 35th Anniversary Tour (Live)|align="center"|—
|align="center"|—
|align="center"|—
|align="center"|—
|One- and two-CD live compilation
|-
|2017
| Pat Benatar and Neil Giraldo: We Live For Love|align="center"|—
|align="center"|—
|align="center"|—
|align="center"|—
|One-DVD live acoustic compilation
|}

 Worldwide compilations 

 Singles 

Notes
^ "We Belong" also peaked at number 34 on the Billboard Adult Contemporary chart.
^ "Dancing Through the Wreckage" peaked at number 22 on the Billboard'' Adult Contemporary chart. It is her first song to chart there since "We Belong" in 1984.

Other charted songs, B-sides, soundtracks

Music videos

References

Discographies of American artists
Rock music discographies